Heather Renee French Henry (born December 29, 1974)  is a  Miss America title holder, fashion designer, and veterans advocate. She is married to former Kentucky Lieutenant Governor Steve Henry.

Biography
Raised in Augusta, Kentucky, Heather French Henry graduated from the University of Cincinnati College of Design, Architecture, Art, and Planning. She competed in pageants through her teens, including the Miss Ohio pageant.  She competed in the Miss Kentucky Pageant four times before winning the title on her fifth attempt in 1999. She won the 2000 Miss America pageant in September 1999, the first Kentuckian to do so. Her platform for her reign was raising awareness of homeless veterans; her father was a wounded veteran of the Vietnam War. She received numerous awards for her work with veterans, including Kentuckian of the Year by Kentucky Monthly.

On October 27, 2000, she married Kentucky Lieutenant Governor Steve Henry, 21 years her senior, in Louisville.  The wedding led to controversy over state resources being expended as part of the wedding and planning. The Henrys repaid the state $3,200 for services related to their wedding rendered to them by state employees.  The couple have two daughters, Harper Renee (born 2001) and Taylor Augusta (born 2003).
 
In October 2003, French Henry struck and subsequently killed Karola Stede, 44, a native of Germany and mother of four who was crossing against the traffic light in a Louisville intersection. French said that the accident deeply affected her, and she subsequently recounted her story in venues such as The Oprah Winfrey Show.

In November 2007, she was named to Kentucky Governor-elect Steve Beshear's transition team. On July 1, 2014, Beshear appointed Henry Commissioner of the Kentucky Department of Veterans Affairs.

French Henry was the 2019 Democratic nominee for Secretary of State of Kentucky. She lost the general election to Michael Adams.

See also
 List of people from the Louisville metropolitan area

References

External links

 Heather French Foundation for Veterans Website
 Heather French Henry's Official Website
 Kentucky Department of Veterans Affairs Commissioner Bio 

|-

1974 births
Living people
Beauty pageants in Kentucky
Kentucky Democrats
Miss America 2000 delegates
Miss America Preliminary Swimsuit winners
Miss America winners
Miss Kentucky winners
People from Louisville, Kentucky
People from Maysville, Kentucky
Spouses of Kentucky politicians
Women in Kentucky politics
20th-century American people
Beauty queen-politicians